Crataegus chrysocarpa is a species of hawthorn that is native to much of the continental United States and Canada. Common names fireberry hawthorn and goldenberry hawthorn, as well as the scientific name all refer to the colour of the unripe fruit, although the mature fruit is red and in var. vernonensis is "deep claret-colored … nearly black when over-ripe".

Three varieties C. chrysocarpa var. chrysocarpa, var. piperi, and var. vernonensis are recognized.

Images

See also 
 List of hawthorn species with yellow fruit
 List of hawthorn species with black fruit

References

External links
USDA Plants Profile for C. chrysocarpa var. piperi

chrysocarpa
Flora of Eastern Canada
Flora of Western Canada
Flora of the Northeastern United States
Flora of the North-Central United States
Flora of the Northwestern United States
Flora of the Great Lakes region (North America)
Flora of the Rocky Mountains
Flora of New Mexico
Flora of Utah
Flora without expected TNC conservation status